The Amazing Impostor is a 1919 American silent comedy film starring Mary Miles Minter and directed by Lloyd Ingraham. As with many of Minter's features, it is thought to be a lost film.

Plot

As described in various film magazine reviews, Joan Hope (Minter) is the daughter of the "Chewing Gum King" (Periolat), who longs for adventure and romance. When her father is away on business, she seizes the opportunity to do a little travelling of her own. On the train, she meets the "Countess of Crex" (Shelby) who proposes that, being of similar appearance and dress, she and Joan should swap identities for a week. Joan agrees eagerly, unaware that the "Countess" is in fact a crook in possession of stolen diamonds, who proposes the swap in the hope of avoiding the detective on her trail.

While Joan and the "Countess" are swapping personal effects, their packages are also swapped by mistake, leaving the "Countess" with a box of chewing gum, and Joan with the stolen diamonds. Quite unaware of this, Joan checks into a hotel under the name of the "Countess of Crex," trailed by Detective Kent Standish (Forrest), who is convinced that she is the real thief.

For a time, Joan enjoys the attention that comes with being a Countess, along with the attentions of Standish, who is attracted to her despite the fact that he believes her to be a married criminal. However, the appeal of her new identity begins to wane when she is threatened firstly by some Russians demanding papers, and then by crooks demanding the diamonds.

At this point Joan's father, having returned home to find his daughter gone, arrives at the hotel, along with the original fake Countess, who is seeking to exchange the box of chewing gum for the diamonds. The truth is revealed, the crooks are arrested, and Detective Standish is pleased to discover that Joan is neither a criminal nor married.

Cast
Mary Miles Minter - Joan Hope
Edward Jobson - Plinius Plumm Plunket
Margaret Shelby - Countess of Crex
Carl Stockdale - Robert La Rue
Allan Forrest - Kent Standish
Henry A. Barrows - Herbert Thornton
George Periolat - Henry Hope
Demetrius Mitsoras - Mike
John Gough - Ike

References

External links
 
 lantern slide(Wayback Machine)

1919 films
American silent feature films
Lost American films
Films directed by Lloyd Ingraham
American black-and-white films
1919 comedy films
American Film Company films
Silent American comedy films
Lost comedy films
1919 lost films
Films with screenplays by Joseph F. Poland
1910s American films
1910s English-language films
English-language comedy films